The following is a list of presently-operating bus transit systems in the United States with regular service. The list excludes charter buses, private bus operators, paratransit systems, and trolleybus systems. Figures for daily ridership, number of vehicles, and daily vehicle revenue miles are accurate as of 2009 and come from the FTA National Transit Database.

Alabama

Alaska

Arizona

Arkansas

California

Colorado

Connecticut

Delaware

District of Columbia

Florida

Georgia

Hawaii

Idaho

Illinois

Indiana

Iowa

Kansas

Kentucky

Louisiana

Maine

Maryland

Massachusetts

Michigan

Minnesota

Mississippi

Missouri

Montana

Nebraska

Nevada

New Hampshire

New Jersey

New Mexico

New York

North Carolina

North Dakota

Ohio

Oklahoma

Oregon

Pennsylvania

Rhode Island

South Carolina

South Dakota

Tennessee

Texas

Utah

Vermont

Virginia

Washington

West Virginia

Wisconsin

Wyoming

See also
List of United States local bus agencies by ridership
List of bus rapid transit systems in North America
List of bus operating companies
List of rail transit systems in the United States
List of trolleybus systems in the United States

References

External links
National Transit Database – Transit Agency Listing
National Transit Database – Charts of annual and monthly transit ridership data

Bus